KDJW (1010 AM) is a radio station broadcasting a Catholic radio format in Amarillo, Texas, United States. The station is currently owned by Catholic Radio of the Texas High Plains.

A sports station until 2017, the then-KTNZ was sold that year to Saint Valentine Catholic Radio for $150,000. ESPN Radio programs moved to KGNC.

In 2021, English-language programming was moved exclusively to 1010 kHz, which also reclaimed its former longtime KDJW call sign from the station at 1360. That frequency was relaunched as a Spanish-language Catholic radio station, "Radio San Toribio".

References

External links
 
 

DJW
Catholic radio stations
Radio stations established in 1947
1947 establishments in Texas
Catholic Church in Texas